Jan Lindhardt (24 April 1938, in Copenhagen – 11 November 2014) was a Danish theologian and writer. He was the son of professor Dr Poul Georg Lindhardt and Gerda Winding, and the elder brother of the Rev Mogens Lindhardt. His nephew is actor Thure Lindhardt. He was married to Tine Lindhardt, Bishop of Funen from 2012 until his death. He graduated with a doctorate in theology from Copenhagen University in 1962, and served as Bishop of Roskilde Diocese from 1997–2008.

Death
Jan Lindhardt died on 11 November 2014 from Alzheimer's disease.

Opinions
Lindhardt often commented publicly on developments in the Lutheran Danish state church. Along with Jacob Holm, of the church Fredenskirken in Viby J, he held the opinion that Hell in the traditional concept does not exist, and that the Danish National Church's concept should instead regard a more universalist doctrine. This view was rejected by the fundamentalist Inner Mission organization.

Bibliography

Lindhardt has published: 
 Machiavelli, 1969
 The political, human, 1970
 Rhetoric, 1975 (new ed. 1987)
 Conscience as compared with LB Bojesen, 1979
 Rhetorician, Poeta Historicus. Studien über rhetorische Erkenntnis und im Lebensanschauung Italienische Renaissancehumanismus, Leiden, 1979
 Martin Luther. Cognition and communication in the Renaissance, 1983
 Martin Luther. Renaissance and Reformation, 1983
 From talking to thought: the main lines of European history of ideas, 1987
 Speech and writing. Two cultures, 1989
 Between the Devil and God. About Martin Luther, 1991
 Renaissance and modern times, 1992
 The vivid picture of the open space, 1993
 Down from the shelf. About ethics disappearance and possible reappearance, 1998
 Catechism of Christianity. children learning for adults, 2000
 The seven deadly sins, 2001
 Into the Outer, 2001
 A minor character in my life: memoirs prematurely, 2003
 From prayer world, 2004
 Church?: Church in the Danish society, 2005

References

1938 births
2014 deaths
20th-century Danish clergy
21st-century Danish clergy
20th-century Christian universalists
21st-century Christian universalists
Christian universalist theologians
Danish male writers
People from Copenhagen
Place of death missing
Deaths from dementia in Denmark
Deaths from Alzheimer's disease